Salomón Wbias Nava (born March 9, 1996, in Mexico City, Mexico) is a Mexican professional footballer who currently plays as a defender for Cal FC.

Honours
Mexico U17
 CONCACAF U-17 Championship: 2013
 FIFA U-17 World Cup runner-up: 2013

Club career
Wbias played with the Pachuca academy from 2011, before moving on loan to United Soccer League club Orange County SC on 2 February 2017.

References

1996 births
Living people
Mexican expatriate footballers
Mexican footballers
Mexico youth international footballers
Footballers from Mexico City
C.F. Pachuca players
Orange County SC players
USL Championship players
Mexican expatriate sportspeople in the United States
Expatriate soccer players in the United States
Association football defenders
United Premier Soccer League players
Mexican beach soccer players